Daphnella ponteleviensis is an extinct species of sea snail, a marine gastropod mollusk in the family Raphitomidae.

Distribution
Fossils of this marine species were found in Miocene strata of Loire-et-Cher, France.

References

 Cossmann (M.), 1896 Essais de Paléoconchologie comparée (2ème livraison), p. 1-179

ponteleviensis
Gastropods described in 1896